The Dicastery for Divine Worship and the Discipline of the Sacraments is the dicastery of the Roman Curia that handles most affairs relating to liturgical practices of the Latin Church as distinct from the Eastern Catholic Churches and also some technical matters relating to the sacraments.

Prior to June 2022, the dicastery was officially named the Congregation for Divine Worship and the Discipline of the Sacraments (only the first word being different). This former name has often been shortened to Congregation for Divine Worship, further abbreviated as Divine Worship or CDW.

History of related dicasteries

List of accorded responsibilities
The Apostolic Constitution Pastor bonus, issued by Pope John Paul II on 28 June 1988, established the congregation's functions:

 Regulation and promotion of the liturgy, primarily of the sacraments
 Regulation of the administration of the sacraments, especially regarding their valid and licit celebration
 Promoting liturgical pastoral activity, especially regarding the celebration of the Eucharist
 Drawing up and revision of liturgical texts
 Reviewing particular calendars and proper texts for the Mass and the Divine Office
 Promoting the liturgical apostolate or sacred music, song or art
 Ensuring that liturgical norms are accurately observed, and that abuses are avoided and eliminated where they are found to exist.
 Examining the fact of non-consummation in a marriage and the existence of a just cause for granting a dispensation.
 Examining cases concerning the nullity of ordination.
 Regulating the cult of relics, the confirmation of heavenly patrons in a diocese or locality
 The valid authorisation of canonical coronations for venerated Catholic images decreed from a Pope
 The elevation of sanctuaries to the title of minor basilica.
 Giving assistance to bishops so that the prayers and pious exercises of the Christian people may be fostered and held in high esteem.

On 30 August 2011, Pope Benedict XVI transferred jurisdiction over unconsummated marriages and the nullification of ordinations to the Roman Rota to relieve the congregation of administrative burdens and allow it to focus on liturgy, its principal responsibility. In 2012, the congregation added an office devoted to liturgical architecture and music.

From 2001 to 2017, the congregation had primary authority over a nation's liturgical translations. On 9 September 2017, Pope Francis weakened the congregation's authority with his motu proprio titled Magnum principium, ensuring that, starting 1 October 2017, the nation's Conference of Bishops will manage local liturgical translations.  On 22 October 2017, the Vatican released a letter that Pope Francis had sent to the Prefect of the Congregation for Divine Worship and the Discipline of the Sacrament, Cardinal Robert Sarah, clarifying that the Vatican and its departments would have limited authority to confirm liturgical translations recognized by a local Conference of Bishops, thus retracting a commentary which Sarah had published on 13 October  2017.

In March 2021, following Sarah's retirement, Pope Francis charged Claudio Maniago, leader of the Italian Episcopal Conference's liturgy programs, with undertaking a canonical visitation of the Congregation of Divine Worship in anticipation of the appointment of a new prefect. Francis then named Arthur Roche prefect on 27 May 2021.

Cardinal Prefects 

 Domenico Ferrata (1908–1914)
 Filippo Giustini (1914–1920)
 Michele Lega (1920–1935)
 Domenico Jorio (1935–1954)
 Benedetto Aloisi Masella (1954–1968)
 Francesco Carpino (7 April 1967 – 26 June 1967) 
 Francis James Brennan (1968)
 Antonio Samorè (prefect, Divine Worship, 1968–1969; prefect, Discipline of the Sacraments, 1968–1974)
 Benno Walter Gut (1969–1970)
 Arturo Tabera (1971–1973)
 James Knox (1974–1981)
 Giuseppe Casoria, (pro-prefect 1981–1983, prefect 1983–1984)
 Paul Mayer (pro-prefect 1984–1985, prefect 1985–1988)
 Eduardo Martínez Somalo (1988–1992)
 Antonio María Javierre Ortas (1992–1996)
 Jorge Medina (pro-prefect 1996–1998, prefect 1998–2002)
 Francis Arinze (2002–2008)
 Antonio Cañizares Llovera (2008–2014)
 Robert Sarah (2014–2021)
 Arthur Roche (2021–present)

Secretary 

Annibale Bugnini (1969–1975)
Lajos Kada (1984–1991)
Geraldo Majella Agnelo (1991–1999)
Francesco Pio Tamburrino (1999–2003)
Domenico Sorrentino (2003–2005)
Malcolm Ranjith (2005–2009)
Joseph Augustine Di Noia (2009–2012)
Arthur Roche (2012–2021)
Vittorio Francesco Viola (2021–present)

Vox Clara Committee
In 2001 the congregation established the Vox Clara Committee, composed of senior bishops from episcopal conferences throughout the English-speaking world. It advises the congregation on English-language liturgical texts and their distribution. It meets in Rome.

See also

 Magnum principium
 Musicam sacram
 Notitiae, the congregation's official journal
 Redemptionis sacramentum

References

External links 
 Official website
 Vatican website